The group stage of the 1997 CAF Champions League was played from 22 August to 9 November 1997. A total of eight teams competed in the group stage.

Format
In the group stage, each group was played on a home-and-away round-robin basis. The winners of each group advanced directly to the final.

Groups
The matchdays were 22–24 August, 5–7 September, 19–21 September, 1–12 October, 24–26 October, and 7–9 November 1997.

Group A

Group B

References

External links
1997 CAF Champions League - afrik11.com

2